The Conference of Churches on the Rhine (German: Konferenz der Kirchen am Rhein (KKR); French: Conférence des églises riveraines du Rhin) is an ecumenical organization of European Christians founded in 1961. It is a member of the World Council of Churches and a grouping within the Communion of Protestant Churches in Europe. It includes churches in Germany, France, Austria, Liechtenstein, Luxembourg, and Switzerland. Its members include:

 Evangelical Church of the Augsburg Confession in Austria
 Evangelical Church of the Palatinate
 Evangelical Church in Baden
 Evangelical-Lutheran Church in Württemberg 
 Evangelical Church in the Rhineland
 Evangelical Church in Germany
 Evangelical Church of the Canton of Thurgau
 Evangelical Reformed Church of the Canton Basel-Landschaft
 Evangelical-Reformed Church of the Canton Basel-Stadt
 Evangelical Reformed Church of the Canton of Schaffhausen
 Evangelical Reformed Church of the Canton of St. Gallen
 Evangelical Reformed Church of the Canton of Zürich
 Federation of Swiss Protestant Churches
 Protestant Church in Baden
 Protestant Church in Hesse and Nassau
 Protestant Church of Augsburg Confession of Alsace and Lorraine
 Protestant Church in the Netherlands
 Protestant Federation of France
 Protestant Reformed Church of Alsace and Lorraine
 Reformed Church of Aargau

External links 
German- and French-language resources
World Council of Churches listing

Christian organizations established in 1961
Protestant ecumenism
Members of the World Council of Churches
Denominational alliances
Protestantism in Europe
Regional councils of churches